Rockets is a French space rock band that formed in Paris in 1974 and relocated to Italy in 1978. Some of the former members had played together since 1970 in a local band called Crystal. In their most successful era (1977–1982) the line-up comprised vocalist Christian Le Bartz, bassist and vocalist "Little" Gérard L'Her, guitarist and keyboardist Alain Maratrat, drummer and percussionist Alain Groetzinger, and keyboardist Fabrice Quagliotti. The band went through a number of name changes, being known as the Rocket Men and Rok-Etz, among others. In the year 2000, Fabrice Quagliotti decided to reform the band (initially with the name Rockets N.D.P.), but with a totally different line-up. This brought to an anomalous situation, as far as none of the former members agreed to hold a reunion. In fact, the last former member to leave the band was Alain Maratrat, in 1992.

Band members
Rockets
John Biancale – vocals (2006–present)
Gianluca Martino – guitar (2004–present)
Rosaire Riccobono – bass (2004–present)
Fabrice Quagliotti – keyboards (1977–present)
Eugenio U. G. Mori – drums, percussion (2005–present)
Former members
Patrick Mallet – drums (1974)
Guy Maratrat – guitar (1974–1975)
André Thus – keyboards (1974–1975)
Christian Le Bartz – vocals (1974–1983)
Alain Groetzinger – drums, percussion (1974–1983)
"Little" Gérard L'Her – bass, vocals (1974–1984)
Alain Maratrat – guitar, keyboards (1974–1992)
Michel Goubet – keyboards (1976–1977)
Bernard Torelli – guitar (1975–1976)
Bertin Hugo – keyboards (1977)
Sal Solo – vocals (1984–1992)
Little B. – drums (2000–2005)
Guest musicians
Phil Gould – drums (1986)
Andrew Paresi – drums (1986)
Bruce Nockles – trumpet (1986)
Alison Lee – vocals (1986)
Paul McClements – vocals (1986)
Carole Cook – vocals (1986)
Nick Beggs – bass (1992)
Herve Koster – drums (1992)
Michael Payne – percussion, vocals (1992)
Matt Rossato – guitar (2001–2004)

Discography

Rockets (1976)
On the Road Again (1978)
Sound of the Future (1979)
Plasteroïd (1979)
Galaxy (1980)
π 3,14 (1981)
Atomic (1982)
Imperception (1984)
One Way (1986)
Another Future (1992)
Don't Stop (2003)
Kaos (2014)
Wonderland (2019)
Alienation (2021)

Covers
A cover version of their song "Ideomatic" was recorded by the industrial metal band Digitalis Purpurea and was included in the free net compilation Italian Body Music Vol. 2. Digitalis Purpurea re-released the song on their album Aseptic White featuring Celine Cecilia Angel from the Austrian project Sanguis et Cinis.
 International prog metal space opera Docker's Guild recorded a version of "Prophecy" (from Galaxy, 1980) on their debut album The Mystic Technocracy - Season 1: The Age of Ignorance (Lion Music, 2012). Featured on the track are Gregg Bissonette (drums), Tony Franklin (bass), Guthrie Govan (guitars) and project mastermind Douglas R. Docker (keyboards). Their third album The Mystic Technocracy - Season 2: The Age of Entropy (Elevate Records, 2022) features "Le Chemin" (from the debut self-titled album Rockets, 1976) and "Atlantis Town" (from Plasteroid, 1979).

Notes

References
 (unavailable as of June 27, 2022)

Musical groups established in 1974
French rock music groups
French experimental music groups
French electronic music groups
French space rock musical groups